DELO Industrie Klebstoffe GmbH & Co. KGaA (inherent spelling: DELO; international brand name: DELO Industrial Adhesives) is a leading manufacturer of industrial adhesives and equipment for dispensing as well as curing adhesives. The company has its headquarters in Windach near Munich, Germany, and employs 780 people. It operates worldwide from subsidiaries in the US, China, Singapore and Japan as well as representative offices in South Korea, Taiwan and Malaysia. Customers include Bosch, Huawei, Siemens und Sony.

Founded in 1961, Sabine and Wolf-Dietrich Herold took over DELO in the course of a management buy-out and converted it into an independent, owner-managed company.

Products and technology
Adhesives, potting compounds and optical materials from DELO are mainly used for microelectronic and optical applications in consumer electronics and the automotive industry. The company specializes in UV curing and dual-curing polymers for high-volume industrial production. These products obtain their complete or initial strength under UV light.

Delo is regarded the world market leader in smart card bonding, for example for encapsulating credit card chips. In addition, almost every mobile phone in the world contains DELO adhesives.

DELO also develops and produces microdispensing valves and UV LED lamps for dispensing and curing adhesives, respectively.

Timeline
 1961 Foundation
 1997 In the course of a management buy-out, DELO becomes an independent company managed by Wolf-Dietrich Herold and Sabine Herold
 2004 Establishment of a representative office in Shanghai/China
 2005 Establishment of a representative office in Singapore
 2008 Foundation of a subsidiary in Boston, USA - DELO Industrial Adhesives LLC
 2012 Foundation of a subsidiary in Singapore - DELO Industrial Adhesives (Singapore) Pte. Ltd.
 2013 Foundation of a subsidiary in Shanghai, China - DELO Industrial Adhesives (Shanghai) Co. Ltd
 2017 Foundation of a subsidiary in Yokohama, Japan -  DELO Industrial Adhesives Inc. (Japan)

References

External links

Manufacturing companies of Germany
Chemical companies established in 1961
Chemical companies of Germany
German brands
1961 establishments in West Germany
1989 mergers and acquisitions
German companies established in 1961